The DF4 (Chinese: 东风4) is a type of diesel-electric locomotive used in the People's Republic of China. It has been in production since 1969 and is still produced as of 2007 by several local companies. It is the most common locomotive in China and is used for both passenger and freight services.

Models

DF4
The first DF4 was built in 1969 in Dalian. The first 108 locomotives that were built here are the original DF4s using the 16V240ZJ engine. It took seven years to build all 108 locomotives of this type. Due to unstable technique in the production of early-built DF4 locomotives, malfunctions of mechanic and electric parts occurred frequently during the operation, especially the diesel engine. Thus, most DF4 locomotives were taken out of service for maintenance, and railroad engineers from Fengtai Locomotive Depot sarcastically joked that the DF4 "can't make it from Dongdan to Xisi", two neighborhoods of Beijing.  Therefore, Dalian Locomotive Works introduced 16V240ZJA, an improved diesel engine.

Few of the early series DF4 are still in operation. The first DF4 of the class is currently in permanent exhibition at the Beijing Railway Museum.

DF4A

The DF4A distinguishes itself from first series DF4s with an improved engine, the 16V240ZJA. Production started in 1976 (the first model being DF4-0109) and lasted until 1984. The DF4A designation is unofficial.

DF4B

Nicknamed "Watermelon", "Armed Police", or "Orange". Generally speaking, "Watermelons" and "Armed Police" versions are used for freight, while "Oranges" (DF4 2000 Series) are manufactured with alternated gear ratio for the allowance of increased operation speed, intended for passenger services. DF4B are very similar to standard DF4, apart from an improved engine (16V240ZJB) and modified engine inlet filters in certain instances. Production started in Dalian in 1984.

DF4C

The DF4C was supposed to replace the DF4B as the main diesel locomotive in China and comes with several improvements, including a new engine revision (16240ZJC). The first DF4C was produced in 1985 and batch production started four years later, in 1989, and lasted until roughly the end of the 20th century. The first two DF4C (4001 and 4002) produced in 1985 continued the use of the DF4B hull. A new hull design is applied for the batch-produced configuration.

The DF4C comes in a different color scheme than the previous DF4s, namely dark blue and later light blue and beige. The passenger version, informally called DF4CK, has an A1A-A1A wheel arrangement.

Gearing variations
The passenger variant was often painted orange.

DF4D

The DF4D, the most recent DF4 revision, has been produced since 1996 with the 16V240ZJD engine. The freight version comes in a different color scheme than the previous DF4Ds, namely green (7000 Series) and later light blue (4000 Series) and yellow. The green version sat on radial bogies but later converted to standard bogies. Their top speed to 100 km/h (62 mph).
DF4D-7000 series are configured with shorter hull compared to standard DF4D series.

DF4DJ
The DF4DJ, originally DF4DAC, of which only 2 were built had AC drive technology supplied by Siemens. They were China's first AC drive diesel locomotive.

DF4DD
A road-switcher version of the DF4 with side walkways and a full-body cab similar to modern American locomotives. The type was the most powerful road switcher class in China until the introduction of the HXN3B and HXN5B classes.

DF4E
The DF4E is a 2 unit locomotive of total power 4.86MW (2x2.43MW)

Manufacturers
DF4s have been manufactured by several companies:
 CSR Sifang Locomotive and Rolling Stock Co., Ltd.
 CSR Ziyang Locomotive Works (DF4B, DF4C & DF4C (A1A))
 Dalian Locomotive & Rolling Stock Works
 Datong locomotive factory

North Korea
In 2001, the Korean State Railway bought two locomotives of type CKD4A (DF4D) new from CNR Dalian; these were delivered in July 2002. They are painted in the standard light blue over dark green, but their numbers are not known.

Between 2006 and 2008, three batches of refurbished second-hand DF4 ("DF4A") and DF4B were delivered to North Korea. These are numbered in the 내연200 series (내연 = Naeyŏn, "internal combustion") and are in service for passenger and freight trains all over North Korea; many are assigned to the Hamhŭng area. The total number delivered is not known, but the number is at least 36 units, numbered 내연201 to 내연225 and 내연261 to 내연271. Many are still in their former Chinese paint, but some have been repainted into the standard light blue over dark green, and two have received the dark green/yellow scheme applied to many M62-type diesels obtained second hand from Germany and Slovakia. There is at least one DF4D, in standard blue over green livery.

Gallery

Preservation

DF4/DF4A 
 DF4-0001: is preserved at the China Railway Museum
 DF4-0002: is preserved at Fengtai Locomotive Depot, Beijing Railway Bureau
 DF4-0084: is preserved at Baoji Railway Technicion College
 DF4-0187: is preserved at Shandong Polytechnic
 DF4-0212: is preserved at Hebei Vocational College Of Rail Transportation
 DF4-2002: is preserved at Zhejiang Normal University
 DF4-2012: is preserved at Jinan Railway Advanced Technical School

DF4B 
 DF4B-1029: is preserved at the Shengyang Railway Museum
 DF4B-1442: is preserved at Taiyuan Locomotive Depot, Taiyuan Railway Bureau
 DF4B-1718: is preserved at Anhui Communications Vocational & Technical College
 DF4B-1781: is preserved at Heilongjiang Communications Polytechnic
 DF4B-1787: is preserved at Liuzhou Industrial Museum
 DF4B-1884: is preserved at Heilongjiang Communications Polytechnic
 DF4B-1893: is preserved at Fengtai Locomotive Depot, Beijing Railway Bureau
 DF4B-1983: is preserved at Central South University
 DF4B-2127: is preserved at Qiqihar Technician College
 DF4B-2244: is preserved at Nanjing Railway Vacational Technical College
 DF4B-2298: is preserved at Qiqihar Railway Engineering School
 DF4B-2480: is preserved at Liuzhou Railway Vacational Technical College.
 DF4B-3179: is preserved at Huhhot Vocational College
 DF4B-6210: is preserved at North University of China
 DF4B-7019: is preserved at Southwest Jiaotong University
 DF4B-7149: is preserved at Shijiazhuang Tiedao University
 DF4B-7260: is preserved at Tianjin Railway Vacational Technical College
 DF4B-9008: is preserved at the China Railway Museum

DF4C 
 DF4C-4001: is preserved at the China Railway Museum
 DF4C-4040: is preserved at the China Railway Museum
 DF4C-5331: is preserved at the Shenyang Railway Museum

References

External links
 CR DF4B @ Trainspo

DF4
Diesel-electric locomotives of North Korea
Co-Co locomotives
Co-Co+Co-Co locomotives
A1A-A1A locomotives
Railway locomotives introduced in 1969
Standard gauge locomotives of China
Standard gauge locomotives of North Korea
CRRC Qingdao Sifang locomotives
CSR Ziyang Locomotive Co., Ltd. locomotives
Siemens locomotives